The Australian College of Christian Studies (formerly part of Tabor College Australia) is an Australian Bible college offering vocational and under-graduate courses in ministry, theology and counselling and chaplaincy with post-graduate courses accredited through the Sydney College of Divinity. There are campuses in Sydney at Burwood, New South Wales and Perth at Karrinyup, Western Australia. A high proportion of the colleges students access courses online.

References

External links

2014 establishments in Australia
Evangelical seminaries and theological colleges in Australia
Educational institutions established in 2014